Henry Dias Abeygoonewardane (29 December 1917 - ) was a Sri Lankan politician and member of parliament.

In 1947, standing as the Communist Party's candidate, Abeygoonewardane was elected to the first parliament of Ceylon, representing the Matara electorate. He received over 57% of the vote whilst his nearest rival obtained only 25%.

References 

1917 births
date of death missing
Members of the 1st Parliament of Ceylon
Communist Party of Sri Lanka politicians